Paweł Poljański (born 6 May 1990) is a Polish former professional racing cyclist, who rode professionally between 2014 and 2020, for the  and  teams. He rode in the 2014 Giro d'Italia. He was named in the start list for the 2015 Vuelta a España. In June 2017, he was named in the startlist for the 2017 Tour de France.

Major results
2008
 3rd Overall Giro della Lunigiana
1st  Points classification
 5th Overall Tour d'Istrie
2011
 2nd Overall Carpathia Couriers Paths
1st Stage 3
2012
 1st  Road race, National Road Championships
 2nd Coppa della Pace
2015
 9th Overall Tour of Austria
  Combativity award Stage 13 Vuelta a España

Grand Tour general classification results timeline

References

External links

1990 births
Living people
Polish male cyclists
Place of birth missing (living people)